The Family Skeleton is a surviving 1918 American silent drama film directed by Victor Schertzinger and Jerome Storm and written by Thomas H. Ince and Bert Lennon. The film stars Charles Ray, Sylvia Breamer, Andrew Arbuckle, William Elmer, Otto Hoffman, and Jack Dyer. The film was released on March 31, 1918, by Paramount Pictures.

Plot
As described in a film magazine, Billy Bates (Ray) believes that he has inherited the desire for strong drink from his father and, in order to live apart from his friends unmolested, he retires to a cheap saloon where each day finds him sinking lower. Poppy Drayton (Breamer) loves Billy and decides to save him from himself. She hatches a plan that makes Billy believe that she has been kidnapped, and Billy finds that he can do without John Barleycorn when the safety of the woman he loves is at stake.

Cast 
Charles Ray as Billy Bates
Sylvia Breamer as Poppy Drayton
Andrew Arbuckle as Dr. Griggs
William Elmer as 'Spider' Doyle 
Otto Hoffman as Billy's Valet
Jack Dyer as Wheeler

Reception
Like many American films of the time, The Family Skeleton was subject to cuts by city and state film censorship boards. For example, the Chicago Board of Censors required cuts in Reel 3 of four closeups of woman seated at table with men drinking and to reduce length by half of all other scenes of women shown drinking.

Preservation
Prints are extant in the Library of Congress collection and at the Gosfilmofond Russian State archive.

References

External links

1918 films
1910s English-language films
Silent American drama films
1918 drama films
Paramount Pictures films
Films directed by Victor Schertzinger
Films directed by Jerome Storm
American black-and-white films
American silent feature films
1910s American films